The Keedy House is a historic home located at Boonsboro, Washington County, Maryland, United States. It is a -story home, three bays wide and two deep, built of coursed gray stone about 1790.  Also on the property is a small stone bank house with a two-story porch and a small stone springhouse.

The Keedy House was listed on the National Register of Historic Places in 1974.

References

External links
, including photo from 1973, at Maryland Historical Trust

Boonsboro, Maryland
Houses on the National Register of Historic Places in Maryland
Houses in Washington County, Maryland
Houses completed in 1790
National Register of Historic Places in Washington County, Maryland